Lodi High School is a high school located in Lodi, Wisconsin. It is part of the School District of Lodi.

Extra-curricular activities 
Sports offered include baseball, softball, cross country, track, boys' basketball, girls' basketball, boys' soccer, girls' soccer, football, wrestling, tennis and volleyball.

State Championships 
2013 Baseball: 6–2 over Green Bay Notre Dame
2017 Football: 17–10 over St Croix Central

Rivalries 
Lodi has multiple rivalries with multiple teams. The more well-known rivalries are Poynette, and Sauk Prairie. Poynette have been in the same conferences since 1982, but will be separated in 2020 for football only. Sauk Prairie and Lodi play in the "Wisconsin River Classic" and Battle for the Paddle. The paddle is blue on one side and red on the other. Sauk Prairie leads the trophy series 4–2, with Lodi winning the last contest in 2019, 61–53. Other notable rivalries are with Lakeside Lutheran and Wisconsin Dells.

Notable alumni 
 Tom Wopat, actor

References

Public high schools in Wisconsin
Educational institutions established in 1999
1999 establishments in Wisconsin
Schools in Columbia County, Wisconsin